Melicope micrococca, commonly known as hairy-leaved doughwood or white euodia, is a species of shrub or slender tree in the family Rutaceae and is endemic to eastern Australia. It has trifoliate leaves and white flowers borne in panicles in leaf axils.

Description
It has a relatively smooth, pale brown trunk with some corky irregularities, and flanged at the base of larger specimens. The leaflets have visible oil dots and the underside is a paler shade of green.

Taxonomy
Hairy-leaved doughwood was first described in 1859 by Ferdinand von Mueller who gave it the name Euodia micrococca and published the description in his book, Fragmenta phytographiae Australiae from a specimen collected near Cabramatta by William Woolls. In 1990, Thomas Gordon Hartley changed the name to Melicope micrococca in the journal Telopea.

Distribution and habitat
Its natural range is from the Seven Mile Beach, New South Wales (34° S) to Maryborough, Queensland (25° S).

Ecology
The fruit is eaten by a variety of birds, including the brown cuckoo dove, crimson rosella, green catbird and Lewin's honeyeater. Melicope micrococca is a target species for many insects, including butterflies in the family Papilionidae.

References

micrococca
Trees of Australia
Sapindales of Australia
Flora of New South Wales
Flora of Queensland
Plants described in 1859
Taxa named by Ferdinand von Mueller